The Guatemalan National Natural History Museum or Museo de Historia Natural 'Jorge A. Ibarra'  is a national natural history museum in Guatemala City, Guatemala.

It was founded in 1950 and moved to its present facility in 1986.  It was renamed in honor of its founder and long-term director, Jorge A. Ibarra.

References

External links

Museums in Guatemala
Buildings and structures in Guatemala City
National museums
Natural history museums